Jiaoling County (postal: Chiuling) is a county in the northeast of Guangdong Province, China, bordering Fujian province to the north. Under the jurisdiction of Meizhou City, it was previously known as the Zhenping County (postal: Chenping).

Ethno-linguistic make-up

Jiaoling is noted for its large Hakka population.

Notable people

 Qiu Fengjia or Chiu Feng-Chia (丘逢甲) was a Taiwanese Hakka−Chinese patriot, educator, and poet. He fought to defend Taiwan following the Qing dynasty's cession of Formosa (Taiwan) and the Pescadores to Japan in April of 1895 at the end of the First Sino-Japanese War.  This led to the formation of the Republic of Formosa. Feng Chia University in Taichung, Taiwan is named in honor of him.
 Qiu Nian-Tai or Chiu Nian-Tai (丘念台) was a Taiwanese Hakka-Chinese senator in the KMT led Taiwanese government.  He is the son of Chiu Feng-Chia.
 Xie Jinyuan (謝晉元) was a Chinese nationalist military officer during second Sino-Japanese war.
 Shing-Tung Yau (丘成桐), a Chinese American mathematician and the William Caspar graustein professor of mathematics at Harvard university.
 Professor Xu Sheng Xin (徐聖心教授 ), a professor of Chinese language at the National Taiwan University ( source: http://www.cl.ntu.edu.tw/web/team/team_in.jsp?fp_id=FP1599317202423 )

Climate

References

County-level divisions of Guangdong
Meizhou